Peter DuBois Baldwin (January 11, 1931 – November 19, 2017) was an American actor and director of film and television.

Biography 
Baldwin started his career as an actor, employed as a contract player at Paramount Studios. He played Johnson in the film Stalag 17 and Lieutenant Walker in Little Boy Lost, both made in 1953. In 1962 he played the role of murderer Tony Benson in the Perry Mason episode, "The Case of the Melancholy Marksman", and appeared in the 1970 Italian thriller The Weekend Murders.

Baldwin eventually became a television director with an extensive résumé.  As well as directing many of the episodes of ABC's hit situation comedy The Brady Bunch, he also directed episodes of other ABC hit sitcoms, The Partridge Family, from 1970 to 1971 and Benson, from 1979 to 1980. He was among the directors of episodes of the 1973 NBC sitcom Needles and Pins and of the 1985-1986 CBS sitcom Foley Square, and also helped direct a few episodes of Family Ties in 1987. He won an Emmy in 1988 for the television series The Wonder Years. His last directing credit was an episode of the Disney Channel sitcom Even Stevens in 2002.

In the 1980s, Baldwin directed the short-lived comebacks of Mary Tyler Moore in Mary in 1985 and Lucille Ball in Life with Lucy in 1986. Both lasted 13 episodes.

Baldwin lived with his wife in Pebble Beach, California where he died on November 19, 2017, at age 86.

Filmography

Director

 Sanford and Son (1972, TV Series)
 The Living End (1972)
 The Bob Newhart Show (1973, TV series)
 The Michele Lee Show (1974, TV Series)
 Happy Days (1974, TV series)
 Great Day (1977)
 Space Force (1978)
 The Lovebirds (1979)
 Benson (1979-1980, TV Series)
 Alone at Last (1980)
 One In A Million (1980)
 The Brady Girls Get Married (1981)
 The Harlem Globetrotters on Gilligan's Island (1981)
 The Hoboken Chicken Emergency (1984)
 Lots of Luck (1985)
 Newhart (1987, TV series)
 American Film Institute Comedy Special (1987)
 A Very Brady Christmas (1988)
 Charlie Hoover (1991, TV series)
 Salute Your Shorts (1991, TV series)
 Revenge of the Nerds (1991)
 Meet Wally Sparks (1997)
 Arliss (1997, TV series)
 King's Pawn (1999)
 Driving Me Crazy (2009)

Actor

The Turning Point (1952) - Boy (uncredited)
The Girls of Pleasure Island (1953) - Pvt. Henry Smith
Stalag 17 (1953) - Sgt. Johnson
Houdini (1953) Fred - Bess' Escort (uncredited)
Little Boy Lost (1953) - Lt. Walker
The Ten Commandments (1956) - Courtier (uncredited)
Short Cut to Hell (1957) - Carl Adams
The Tin Star (1957) - Zeke McGaffey
Teacher's Pet (1958) - Harold Miller
The Space Children (1958) - Security Officer James
I Married a Monster from Outer Space (1958) - Officer Hank Swanson
The Trap (1959) - Mellon
Escape by Night (1960) - American Lieutenant Peter Bradley
Love in Rome (1960) - Marcello Cenni
Quattro notti con Alba (1962) - Lieutenant Enrico Fassi
I soliti rapinatori a Milano (1963) - Tony
The Ghost (1963) - Dr. Charles Livingstone
The Possessed (1965) - Bernard, the writer
The Weekend Murders (1970) - Anthony Carter
Roma Bene (1971) - Michele Vismara
The Mattei Affair (1972) - McHale (final film role)

References

External links

1931 births
2017 deaths
American male stage actors
American male film actors
American male television actors
American television directors
Emmy Award winners
People from Winnetka, Illinois
People from Pebble Beach, California
Film directors from California
Film directors from Illinois
20th-century American male actors